The arrondissement of Saint-Quentin is an arrondissement of France in the Aisne department in the Hauts-de-France region. It has 126 communes.

Composition

The communes of the arrondissement of Saint-Quentin, and their INSEE codes are:
 
 Alaincourt (02009)
 Annois (02019)
 Artemps (02025)
 Attilly (02029)
 Aubencheul-aux-Bois (02030)
 Aubigny-aux-Kaisnes (02032)
 Beaurevoir (02057)
 Beauvois-en-Vermandois (02060)
 Becquigny (02061)
 Bellenglise (02063)
 Bellicourt (02065)
 Benay (02066)
 Berthenicourt (02075)
 Bohain-en-Vermandois (02095)
 Bony (02100)
 Brancourt-le-Grand (02112)
 Bray-Saint-Christophe (02117)
 Brissay-Choigny (02123)
 Brissy-Hamégicourt (02124)
 Castres (02142)
 Le Catelet (02143)
 Caulaincourt (02144)
 Cerizy (02149)
 Châtillon-sur-Oise (02170)
 Chevresis-Monceau (02184)
 Clastres (02199)
 Contescourt (02214)
 Croix-Fonsomme (02240)
 Cugny (02246)
 Dallon (02257)
 Douchy (02270)
 Dury (02273)
 Essigny-le-Grand (02287)
 Essigny-le-Petit (02288)
 Estrées (02291)
 Étaves-et-Bocquiaux (02293)
 Étreillers (02296)
 Fayet (02303)
 La Ferté-Chevresis (02306)
 Fieulaine (02310)
 Flavy-le-Martel (02315)
 Fluquières (02317)
 Fonsomme (02319)
 Fontaine-lès-Clercs (02320)
 Fontaine-Notre-Dame (02322)
 Fontaine-Uterte (02323)
 Foreste (02327)
 Francilly-Selency (02330)
 Fresnoy-le-Grand (02334)
 Gauchy (02340)
 Germaine (02343)
 Gibercourt (02345)
 Gouy (02352)
 Gricourt (02355)
 Grugies (02359)
 Happencourt (02367)
 Hargicourt (02370)
 Harly (02371)
 Hinacourt (02380)
 Holnon (02382)
 Homblières (02383)
 Itancourt (02387)
 Jeancourt (02390)
 Joncourt (02392)
 Jussy (02397)
 Lanchy (02402)
 Lehaucourt (02374)
 Lempire (02417)
 Lesdins (02420)
 Levergies (02426)
 Ly-Fontaine (02446)
 Magny-la-Fosse (02451)
 Maissemy (02452)
 Marcy (02459)
 Mesnil-Saint-Laurent (02481)
 Mézières-sur-Oise (02483)
 Montbrehain (02500)
 Mont-d'Origny (02503)
 Montescourt-Lizerolles (02504)
 Montigny-en-Arrouaise (02511)
 Morcourt (02525)
 Moÿ-de-l'Aisne (02532)
 Nauroy (02539)
 Neuville-Saint-Amand (02549)
 Neuvillette (02552)
 Ollezy (02570)
 Omissy (02571)
 Origny-Sainte-Benoite (02575)
 Parpeville (02592)
 Pithon (02604)
 Pleine-Selve (02605)
 Pontru (02614)
 Pontruet (02615)
 Prémont (02618)
 Ramicourt (02635)
 Regny (02636)
 Remaucourt (02637)
 Remigny (02639)
 Renansart (02640)
 Ribemont (02648)
 Roupy (02658)
 Rouvroy (02659)
 Saint-Quentin (02691)
 Saint-Simon (02694)
 Savy (02702)
 Seboncourt (02703)
 Sequehart (02708)
 Serain (02709)
 Seraucourt-le-Grand (02710)
 Séry-lès-Mézières (02717)
 Sissy (02721)
 Sommette-Eaucourt (02726)
 Surfontaine (02732)
 Thenelles (02741)
 Trefcon (02747)
 Tugny-et-Pont (02752)
 Urvillers (02756)
 Vaux-en-Vermandois (02772)
 Vendelles (02774)
 Vendeuil (02775)
 Vendhuile (02776)
 Le Verguier (02782)
 Vermand (02785)
 Villeret (02808)
 Villers-le-Sec (02813)
 Villers-Saint-Christophe (02815)

History

The arrondissement of Saint-Quentin was created in 1800.

As a result of the reorganisation of the cantons of France which came into effect in 2015, the borders of the cantons are no longer related to the borders of the arrondissements. The cantons of the arrondissement of Saint-Quentin were, as of January 2015:

 Bohain-en-Vermandois
 Le Catelet
 Moÿ-de-l'Aisne
 Ribemont
 Saint-Quentin-Centre
 Saint-Quentin-Nord
 Saint-Quentin-Sud
 Saint-Simon
 Vermand

Sub-prefects 
 Paul Joseph Boudier (1854-1908) : 1885

References

Saint-Quentin